Levy Middlebrooks (born February 4, 1966) is an American former professional basketball player. He is best known for college career at Pepperdine University, however, from 1984 to 1988.

A native of San Francisco, California, Middlebrooks attended St. Ignatius College Preparatory and was a standout player for the Wildcats. He earned a scholarship to play for the Waves and thus he enrolled in the fall of 1984. During his freshman year he helped lead them to a West Coast Athletic Conference championship and a berth into the 1985 NCAA Tournament, where Pepperdine would lose in the first round. Middlebrooks was named the WCAC Freshman of the Year. The following season, the Waves once again won the WCAC, qualified for the 1986 NCAA Tournament, and lost in the first round. This would be Middlebrooks' last experience with the NCAA Tournament as the Waves did not make it during his junior season and only qualified for the 1988 National Invitation Tournament in his senior year. During his final two years, Middlebrooks led Pepperdine in rebounding with 9.0 and 10.7 rebounds per game, respectively. As a senior, he was named the WCAC Player of the Year, becoming the eighth player in school history at the time to garner this award.

After his collegiate career ended, Middlebrooks tried out with the Cleveland Cavaliers of the National Basketball Association. He was not selected in the subsequent NBA Draft, and so he carved out a professional career which took him from the Continental Basketball Association to various teams in Mexico, Spain, Cyprus and Argentina. In Mexico, he played for Laguneros, Tecos UAG, and Dorados. In Spain, he played for Obradoiro, Girona and CB Tarragona, while in Cyprus he played for AEK Larnaca. He also played for MZT Skopje from Macedonia.

References 

1966 births
Living people
American expatriate basketball people in Argentina
American expatriate basketball people in Cyprus
American expatriate basketball people in Mexico
American expatriate basketball people in North Macedonia
American expatriate basketball people in Spain
American men's basketball players
Bakersfield Jammers players
Basketball players from San Francisco
CB Girona players
CB Tarragona players
Dorados de Chihuahua (LNBP) players
KK MZT Skopje players
Liga ACB players
Obradoiro CAB players
Olimpia de Venado Tuerto basketball players
Pepperdine Waves men's basketball players
Power forwards (basketball)
Tecolotes UAG players